Kanaka Raju is an Indian gussadi dancer. In 2021, he was awarded Padma Shri by the Indian Government for his contribution in the field of Arts.

Early life
Raju is from Marlawai village, Jainoor mandal in Komaram Bheem Asifabad district.

Career
Raju has been teaching gusadi dance for more than 40 years. He also performed in the Republic Day parade in 1981. He has now been appointed as the chief dance master of Kanaka Raju School of Gussadi dance.

Awards
Padma Shri in 2021

References

Living people
Recipients of the Padma Shri in arts
Year of birth missing (living people)